The Serranía de las Minas is a mountainous region in the Central Andes near Puracé National Natural Park in the Department of Huila of Colombia.  This area gives rise to the waters of the Magdalena River. It is a proposed Flora and Fauna Sanctuary for the existence of primary montane forest and habitat for many important species of amphibians, mammals, and birds.

Geography 

References 

Mountain ranges of Colombia
Mountain ranges of the Andes
Geography of Huila Department
National parks of Colombia